The Mbagathi River is a river in Kenya near Nairobi It is a tributary of the Athi River. It forms the southern boundary of Nairobi National Park. Herds of animals cross the river when migrating.It also forms the eastern boundary of Nairobi county passing through Utawala, between Kamulu and Joska A number of small dams have been built along the river.

References 

Athi-Galana-Sabaki River
Rivers of Kenya